Japan is a nation that has competed at the Hopman Cup tournament on five occasions, the first being at the inaugural annual staging in 1989. Before the introduction of the round robin competition format in 1996, Japan never passed the first round and since its introduction, the nation has never passed the qualification stage of the tournament.

Japan also participated in the first two stagings of the now defunct Asian Hopman Cup, a qualifying tournament which ran from 2006 until 2009 and granted the winners entry into the Hopman Cup the following year. In both 2006 and 2007, Japan failed to progress past the round robin stage of the event, thus failing to gain entry into the main tournament in Australia.

Players
This is a list of players who have played for Japan in the Hopman Cup.

Results

1 Despite losing the qualification play-off in 2000, the Japanese team replaced the injured Belgium team for the tie against Australia. In this tie, Australian opponent Mark Philippoussis was unable to play either of his matches, thus defaulting two points to Japan.

References

Hopman Cup teams
Hopman Cup
Hopman Cup